Dexter B. Davis, Jr. (born December 27, 1990) is an American football linebacker for the Wichita Force of Champions Indoor Football (CIF). He played college football at Friends University and attended Morrow High School in Morrow, Georgia. He has also been a member of the Columbus Lions, Portland Steel, Guangzhou Power, and Baltimore Brigade.

Early life
Davis attended Morrow High School.

College career
Davis played for the Friends Falcons from 2009 to 2012. He was the team's starter his final two years and helped the Falcons to 25 wins. He played in 39 games during his career including 39 starts at defensive end. Davis lead the entire National Association of Intercollegiate Athletics with 14.0 sacks as a junior. Davis was twice named First Team All-Kansas Collegiate Athletic Conference and was the 2011 KCAC Defensive Player of the Year. Davis was also named a two-time American Football Coaches Association All-American.

Statistics
Source:

Professional career

Portland Steel
On November 14, 2014, Davis was assigned to the Portland Thunder. Portland exercised Davis' rookie option to retain him for the 2016 season.

Guangzhou Power
Davis was selected by the Guangzhou Power of the China Arena Football League (CAFL) in the fifth round of the 2016 CAFL Draft. He was selected by the Guangzhou Power in the fourth round of the 2017 CAFL Draft.

Baltimore Brigade
Davis was assigned to the Baltimore Brigade on March 27, 2017. Davis was named the AFL's Defensive Player of the Week for Week 3 following a three sack performance against the Cleveland Gladiators.

References

External links
Friends Falcons profile

1990 births
Living people
People from Clayton County, Georgia
Sportspeople from the Atlanta metropolitan area
Players of American football from Georgia (U.S. state)
African-American players of American football
American football defensive linemen
American football linebackers
Friends Falcons football players
Columbus Lions players
Portland Thunder players
Portland Steel players
Guangzhou Power players
Baltimore Brigade players
Wichita Force players
American expatriate sportspeople in China
21st-century African-American sportspeople